III liga (Trzecia liga) is a Polish football league that sits in the fourth tier of the Polish football league system. Until the end of the 2007–08 season, III liga referred to a league at the third tier (now called II liga) but this was changed with the formation of the Ekstraklasa as the top level league in Poland.

Groups of III liga are divided based on administrative division of Poland. Top teams of III liga are promoted to II liga and bottom teams are relegated to IV liga.

Seasons 2000/01—2007/08 
18–21 parallel divisions as IV liga (one or two in each of 16 Voivodeship)
 2000–01 season – 21 groups
 2001–02 season – 20 groups
 2002–03 season – 19 groups
 2003–04 season – 19 groups
 2004–05 season – 19 groups
 2005–06 season – 19 groups
 2006–07 season – 18 groups
 2007–08 season – 18 groups

Seasons 2008/09—2015/16 
8 parallel divisions as III liga.
Group A (Łódź – Masovian)
Group B (Podlaskie – Warmian-Masurian)
Group C (Kuyavian-Pomeranian – Greater Poland)
Group D (Pomeranian – West Pomeranian)
Group E (Lower Silesian – Lubusz)
Group F (Opole – Silesian)
Group G (Świętokrzyskie – Lesser Poland)
Group H (Lublin – Podkarpackie)

Seasons 2016/17 and on 
4 parallel divisions as III liga.
Group 1 (Łódź – Masovian – Podlaskie – Warmian-Masurian)
Group 2 (Kuyavian-Pomeranian – Greater Poland – Pomeranian – West Pomeranian)
Group 3 (Lower Silesian – Lubusz – Opole – Silesian)
Group 4 (Świętokrzyskie – Lesser Poland – Lublin – Podkarpackie)

Champions of the Polish fourth level

References

 
4
Pol
Professional sports leagues in Poland